Trần Đình Kha (born 21 March 1994) is a Vietnamese footballer who plays as a forward for Khánh Hòa.

References

1994 births
Living people
Vietnamese footballers
Association football forwards
V.League 1 players
People from Phú Yên province